Álvaro Vadillo Cifuentes (born 12 September 1994) is a Spanish professional footballer who plays as a winger for SD Eibar on loan from RCD Espanyol.

Club career

Betis
Vadillo was born in Puerto Real, Province of Cádiz, and joined Real Betis' youth system at the age of 12. On 28 August 2011, he became the second youngest ever player to appear in a La Liga game, as he started in a 1–0 away win against Granada CF at the age of 16 years, 11 months and 16 days. The previous season, he played 14 matches (one goal) as the B team narrowly avoided relegation from Segunda División B.

On 15 October 2011, Vadillo collided with Sergio Ramos in the early minutes of an eventual 4–1 loss at Real Madrid, being stretchered off and sidelined for several months with a torn cruciate ligament. On 1 August 2014 he suffered the same injury, being sidelined for six months.

Huesca
On 18 August 2016, free agent Vadillo signed a one-year contract with Segunda División club SD Huesca. He scored his first goal for them on 1 October, closing the 2–0 home victory over UD Almería.

Vadillo scored a brace in a 2–0 away defeat of Córdoba CF on 12 February 2017. He finished his first season with seven goals from 34 appearances, and achieved promotion to the first division in the second.

Granada
On 27 June 2018, Vadillo signed a two-year deal with Granada CF still in the second division. He won another promotion in his first year, contributing four goals to the feat.

Vadillo scored his first goal in the Spanish top flight on 21 September 2019, his team's second of the match through a penalty to ensure a 2–0 home win against defending champions FC Barcelona and a provisional top position in the standings.

Celta
On 22 July 2020, free agent Vadillo agreed to a three-year deal with RC Celta de Vigo also in the top tier. He did not take part in any games during his spell at the Balaídos.

Espanyol
On 5 October 2020, Vadillo was loaned to RCD Espanyol of the second division for one year. On 2 June of the following year, after their promotion, he signed a permanent contract after his buyout clause was met.

On 5 January 2022, after only six league minutes in three matches, Vadillo was loaned to Málaga CF until the end of the second-tier season. On 22 July, he joined fellow league team SD Eibar also on loan.

Career statistics

Club

Honours
Betis
Segunda División: 2014–15

Espanyol
Segunda División: 2020–21

References

External links

1994 births
Living people
People from Puerto Real
Sportspeople from the Province of Cádiz
Spanish footballers
Footballers from Andalusia
Association football wingers
La Liga players
Segunda División players
Segunda División B players
Betis Deportivo Balompié footballers
Real Betis players
SD Huesca footballers
Granada CF footballers
RC Celta de Vigo players
RCD Espanyol footballers
Málaga CF players
SD Eibar footballers
Spain youth international footballers